Beri Rahmada (born 17 July 1998) is an Indonesian footballer who currently plays as a defender for Sriwijaya.

References

1998 births
Living people
Indonesian footballers
Sriwijaya F.C. players
Association football defenders